The Pangani suckermouth (Chiloglanis deckenii) is a species of upside-down catfish native to Kenya and Tanzania.  This species grows to a length of  SL.

Distribution
It is found in the Mtera Dam, Kidatu Dam, Lake Jipe, the Pangani River, Rufiji River and Ruaha River.

References

External links 

Chiloglanis
Freshwater fish of Kenya
Freshwater fish of Tanzania
Fish described in 1868
Taxa named by Wilhelm Peters
Taxonomy articles created by Polbot